Chauncey Graham Heath (January 27, 1818July 21, 1899) was a member of the Wisconsin State Assembly during the 1st Wisconsin Legislature (1848) representing central Waukesha County.

Biography
Heath was born on January 27, 1818, in Tompkins County, New York. His parents were Milo Heath and Sally Nash.  Later a resident of Pewaukee, Wisconsin, Heath was married to Frances Williams. He died on July 21, 1899, and would be buried in Waukesha, Wisconsin.

Career
Heath was a member of the Assembly during the 1848 session. He was a Democrat.

References

External links
 

|-

1818 births
1899 deaths
People from Tompkins County, New York
People from Pewaukee, Wisconsin
Democratic Party members of the Wisconsin State Assembly
Burials in Wisconsin
19th-century American politicians